Vallnord is a ski/snowboard resort in the Pyrenees mountains in the country of Andorra, close to the border with Spain at Tor, Pallars.

Overview
It encompasses the linked sectors of Pal and Arinsal (the sectors were linked by a cable car, opened in 2005,  from the top of the Arinsal sector) and the Ordino-Arcalis sector some kilometres away.

All the separate sectors within Vallnord contain green, blue, red and black rated runs as well as restaurants and ski schools.

Cycling
In mountain biking, Vallnord was the venue for events during the 2008, 2009, 2013, 2017, 2019 and 2022 UCI Mountain Bike World Cup. The 2015 UCI Mountain Bike & Trials World Championships were held in Vallnord. 

In road cycling, Arcalis was used for a stage finish in the 1994 Vuelta a España, and Pal as a stage finish in the 2010 Vuelta a España. Vallnord was used for stage finishes in the 2007, 2009 and 2011 Volta a Catalunya. Stage 10 of the 1997 Tour de France, Stage 7 of the 2009 Tour de France and Stage 9 of the 2016 Tour de France also all finished at Arcalis.

References

External links 
 
Official Site
Map of the Vallnord area

Ski areas and resorts in Andorra
La Massana
Ordino